Alain Rashiv Estrada Damian (born 13 August 1991) is a Mexican footballer who plays as a goalkeeper for Murciélagos, on loan from Pachuca.

References

1991 births
Living people
People from Nezahualcóyotl
Footballers from the State of Mexico
Association football goalkeepers
Tampico Madero F.C. footballers
Murciélagos FC footballers
Tlaxcala F.C. players
Mexican footballers